Euphoria is a series of dance music compilations that debuted on the Telstar Records label in early 1999. During the first year, Euphoria focused primarily on trance music until mid-2000 when Euphoria released the first chill-out album in the series and the first hard house album in late 2000. 
Euphoria was later spun off into a number of associated club nights around the UK, Ibiza and Cyprus. Over the course of three years, in excess of 500 tour dates were chalked up with tour DJs such as Adam White, Robert Van Ryn, Simon Webdale and Darren James.
The compilations included box sets usually priced at around £20.00. The Euphoria albums were of high quality and still are highly collectible and the earlier versions are somewhat rare.

Frequent DJs and/or producers who have mixed albums include Dave Pearce, Matt Darey, Lisa Lashes, John '00' Fleming, Adam White, The Tidy Boys, Jay Burnett, Red Jerry and Andy Whitby.

When Telstar Records folded in 2004, the brand went to Ministry of Sound recordings.

Since the debut release, the Euphoria brand has showcased other genres in electronic dance music including hard house, hard dance, progressive and psy-trance as well as releasing some (thus far) "one offs" that cover old skool, funky house, hardcore and the ever-popular "mash up".

Although focusing mostly on "Best of" compilations in recent years under various guises, the Euphoria brand went "back to its roots" in mid-2008 with its first release of new (all encompassing) trance music in 3 years as opposed to the subgenre releases. Summer Euphoria was also the first digital-only release under the Euphoria brand.

With no new releases for nearly 18 months, Ministry of Sound released Euphoria 2011 in September of that year. This was a new direction for the Euphoria brand in that the album contained the latest dance music including the recent fusion of dance beats with R&B.

Telstar also launched the Breakdown (its full name being The Very Best of Euphoric Dance Breakdown) series in 1999, the same year as the inaugural Euphoria album, and this brand also went to Ministry of Sound following the folding of Telstar. Breakdown too focused on electronic dance music, but was never focused on trance music in particular, focusing on a wide range of subgenres of dance music, including non-electronic genres such as a disco edition. The series was computer mixed, but did not list a DJ on its cover, but instead in its liner notes. In the book The Complete Book of the British Charts: Singles and Albums, the Breakdown series is erroneously listed as being part of the Euphoria series.

List of Euphoria albums by Telstar Records (Telstar TV) (1999–2004)

Unusually, the last installment of the Telstar years, Deeper Shades of Euphoria (volume 2) was a co-release with Virgin Records/EMI, who had been rival labels with Telstar in the past. It has been suggested Virgin and EMI helped support the album as Telstar entered closure.

List of Euphoria albums by Ministry of Sound (2004-2017)

External links
Released Euphoria albums reference

DJ mix album series
Electronic compilation albums
Electronica compilation albums
1990s compilation albums
2000s compilation albums
2010s compilation albums